This is a list of prisons in Greece.

Adult and juvenile prisons and detention facilities in Greece 

Special Adult Detention Establishments - Rural Prisons
Agia (Crete) Prison
Cassandra Prison
Tyrintha Prison
Central Prison Supply Storage Centre (Kayf)
   
Special Juvenile Establishments
Avlona Special Juvenile Detention Establishment (Ekkn)
Volos Special Juvenile Detention Establishment (Ekkn)
Kassavetia Rural Penitentiary Establishment for Minors (Aska)
   
Therapeutic Establishments
Korydallos Psychiatric Establishment for Prisoners
Korydallos Hospital for Prisoners
Eleona of Thiva Drug Rehabilitation Centre for Prisoners
   
Closed Prisons
Central Prison for Women
Patras Prison
Halkida Prison
Corfu Prison
Alikarnassos Prison
Trikala Prison
Malandrinos Detention Establishment
Domokos Prison
   
Judicial Prisons
Korydallos Prison
Ioannina Prison
Komotini Prison
Corinth Prison
Thesaloniki Prison
Larissa Prison
Nafplio Prison
Neapolis Prison
Tripoli Prison
Chania Prison
Chios Prison
Kos Prison
Amfissa Preventorium for Prisoners

Korydallos Prison, Korydallos
Ioannia Prison, Ioannia
Komotini Prison, Komotini
Corinth Prison, Corinth
Thessaloniki Prison, Thessaloniki
Larissa Prison, Larissa
Nafplio Prison, Nafplio
Neapolis Prison, Neapolis
Tripoli Prison, Tripoli
Chania Prison, Chania
Chios Prison, Chios
Kos Prison, Kos
Amfissa Preventorium For Prisoners, Amfissa

External links
"Greek Ministry of Justice"

 
Greece
Prisons